Yucca neomexicana Wooton & Standl. is a plant in the family Asparagaceae, native to New Mexico, Colorado and Oklahoma. Common name is "New Mexican Spanish Bayonet." It is similar to Y. harrimaniae Trel. but with a longer flowering stalk and white (rather than yellowish) flowers.

References

neomexicana
Flora of New Mexico
Flora of Colorado
Flora of Oklahoma